Clinidium brusteli is a species of ground beetle in the subfamily Rhysodinae. It was described by Ross Bell & J.R. Bell in 2009 and named after entomologist Hervé Brustel. It is only known from its type locality, San Vincente de Huaticocha in Loreto Canton, eastern Ecuador.

Clinidium brusteli holotype, a male, measures  in length.

References

Clinidium
Beetles of South America
Invertebrates of Ecuador
Endemic fauna of Ecuador
Beetles described in 2009